The 2018 African Men's Handball Championship was the 23rd edition of the African Men's Handball Championship and held from 17 to 27 January 2018 in Gabon. It acted as the African qualifying tournament for the 2019 World Men's Handball Championship.

Tunisia won their tenth title after beating Egypt 26–24 in the final.

Venue

Qualified teams

1 Bold indicates champion for that year
2 Italic indicates host country for that year

Preliminary round
The draw was held on 3 November 2017 in Libreville.

All times are local (UTC+1).

Group A

Group B

Knockout stage

Bracket

Fifth place bracket

Quarterfinals

5–8th place semifinals

Semifinals

Ninth place game

Seventh place game

Fifth place game

Third place game

Final

Final ranking

References

External links
Results at todor66
CAHB website

2018 Men
African Men's Handball Championship
Hand
International sports competitions hosted by Gabon
January 2018 sports events in Africa